Dutch family names were not required until 1811 when emperor Napoleon annexed the Netherlands; prior to 1811, the use of patronymics was much more common.

In Dutch linguistics, many names use certain qualifying words (prepositions) which are positioned between a person's given name and their surname.  Although these words, tussenvoegsels, are not strictly essential to state the person's surname, they are nevertheless a part of the surname and are almost always included for clarity.  For example, someone whose family name is "De Vries" is not found at the letter "D" in the telephone directory but at "V"; the "de" is a tussenvoegsel and is not a part of the indexing process but rather is more of a stylistic qualifier. Another reason for this methodology is that it makes finding someone's name in a database relatively easy, since most Dutch prepositions start with the same letter (and thus if the prepositions led, there would be constant superfluous data entry to arrive at the desired name).
In the Netherlands, the tussenvoegsel is written with a capital letter if no name precedes it. For example:
a person with the name "Jan" as a given name and "de Vries" as a surname would be written Jan de Vries or "de heer De Vries", literally, Mr. De Vries.
See also the main Dutch surnames section.

List of Dutch surnames
This random sampling of Dutch surnames is sorted by surname, with the tussenvoegsel following the name after a comma. Meanings are provided where known. See :Category:Dutch-language surnames and :Category:Surnames of Frisian origin for surnames with their own pages.

Baas – The Boss
Bakker – Baker
Beek, van – From the brook
Beekhof - garden brook
Beenhouwer – Butcher
Bijl, van der – "from the axe" – i.e. descended from woodcutters (lumberjacks)
Bos – Forest
Berg, van der – From the cliff, mountain
Berkenbosch- birch wood, a grove of birch trees
Boer, de – the Farmer
Boogaard – from the orchard, Americanised as Bogart
Boogman – Bowman, Archer
Boor, van der – possibly of the same French root as Boer – farmer or simple person; "boorish"  
Boswel, – surname originating from Scotland
Bouwman – in modern Dutch it would be building man (mason or construction worker), but in older Dutch it is farmer
Braam – Blackberry
Brouwer – Brewer
Bruin, de (Bruijn, de) – brown
Buskirk, van – literally "bush church", or "church in the woods"
Byl, van der – Americanization of "van der Bijl"
Coevorden, van – e.g. George Vancouver#Origins of the family name
Citroen – lemon, e.g. André Citroën
Cornelissen – son of Cornelius
Dekker – from the verb dekken or to cover as in covering roof tops (compare "Thatcher")
Dijk, Deijck, van – From the dike
Dijkstra  – From the dike
Dijksma  - Son/Daughter of the dike
Dijkman, Dijkmans  - man from the dike
Dijkgraaf  - earl of the dike: the one in charge of maintenance 
Elzinga
Graaf, de – The count/earl
Groot, de – The tall/great
Groot  - Tall (person)
Haan, de – Rooster
Haas, de – Hare
Heide, van der – from the heath
Hendriks, Hendriksen, Hendrix – Henry's son
Heuvel, van den – From the hill, mound
Hoebee, Hoebeek, Van Hoebeek, – Common last name
Hoek, van de - (corner, sandbar=cape) from the corner; Hoek van Holland as landscape term 
Hoff, van het – (servant) from the court
Kleij, van der – (Kley, Cleij, Cley) Clay
Kneynsberg, - Du: Kneijnsberg; kneijn = konijn: Rabbithill
Koning, de(n) - The King
Koopman - Merchant
Kuiper, Cuyper, Kuyper, de – the Cooper
Lange - Tall (man) 
Lange, de - the Tall (one)
Leeuwen, van – From Leeuwen/Leuven; Levi
Jaager, de – the Hunter
Jansen, Janssen – Jan's son (compare Johnson)
Jong, de – the Junior
Koning, de – the King
Lange, de;– the long/the tall
Linden, van der – from the Linden (type of tree)
Meijer, Meyer – Bailiff or steward
Meer, van der – From the lake
Mesman, mes = knife (maker), cutler
Meulenbelt – artificial mill's hill
Molen, van der – from the Mill
Muis – Mouse
Mulder, Molenaar – Miller
Maarschalkerweerd – Keeper of the horses (compare English marshal + amb
Peters – Peter's son
Prins – Prince
Rolloos
Ruis, Ruys, Ruisch, Ruysch – the sound of wind or water (surname common with millers).
Rynsburger – inhabitant of Rijnsburg
Sittart, van – from Sittard, Anglicised as Vansittart
Smit, Smits – Smith
Stoepker - Curbstone
Spaans – Spanish
Stegenga – The Frisian
Teuling – Toll taker
Thyssen, Thysen - Du: Thijssen: Son of Thijs
Timmerman – Carpenter ("timber man")
Tuinstra – From the Garden
Vinke – Little Bird
Visser	– Fisher
Vliet, van – From the vliet (type of water)
Vries, de – The Frisian
Vos – Fox
Vroom – piously (borne by a 16th–17th century family of artists)
Vuurst, van de(r) - From the Vuursche (Forest area in the middle of the Netherlands)
Wees, de – The Orphan
Wees, van - (oorsprong of the Orphan
Westhuizen, van der – from the houses located in the west
Willems, Willemsen – William's son
Windt, de  - the Wind
Wit, de – White (= the blond)
Zijl, van – from the waterway (Middle Dutch)
Zutphen, van - (From Zutphen, city in the Netherlands)

References